Kishangarh is in Ajmer district, Rajasthan.

Kishangarh may refer to several places:

 Kishangarh, Alwar, a city in Alwar district, Rajasthan.
 Kishangarh Renwal, a city in Jaipur district, Rajasthan.
 Kishangarh Village, a village in Delhi.